Thomas Gobert (c. 1630 or 1640 – c. 1708) was a 17th-century French architect and engineer.

Biography 
He is credited with the construction of the Trianon de Saint-Cloud, since transformed into the pavillon de Breteuil, in the parc of Saint-Cloud, begun in 1670 and completed in 1680. One of the ponds bears his name.

He built the water supply network for the "lower gravity ponds" from Trappes, Arcy and Saclay to supply water to the park of the Château de Versailles between 1678 and 1680.

He also made a bronze equestrian statue of Louis XIV, preserved in the Louvre.

In 1699, Louis XIV appointed him a member of the Académie royale d'architecture, one of the seven first-class academicians.

In 1662, he was married  with Marie Delespine, sister of Nicolas II Delespine, of whom he had a son, Claude-Thomas Gobert, architect, whom he disinherited after his marriage which he did not approve.

Publications 
 Thomas Gobert, Traité pour la pratique des forces mouvantes, qui fait connoistre l'impossibilité du mouvement perpétuel par la nécessité de l'équilibre et une supputation de la pesanteur du globe de la terre, avec un moyen pour le soûtenir par démonstration : précedé d'un discours sur la certitude, l'etendue & l'utilité des mathematiques, Jean-Baptiste Delespine, Paris, 1702 Read online
 Thomas Gobert, Nouveau sistème sur la construction et les mouvemens du monde, avec une dissertation sur la ligne de niveau, Jean-Baptiste Delespine, Paris, 1703 Read online

References

Bibliography 
 Frédéric Tiberghien, Versailles. Le chantier de Louis XIV 1662-1715, éditions Perrin, Paris, 2002 
 Henry Lemonnier, W. Viennot, Procès-verbaux de l'Académie Royale d'Architecture, 1671-1793, volume X Table générale, Armand Colin publisher, Paris, 1926 Read online

External links 
 Thomas Gobert on Structurae
 Thomas Gobert
 Thomas Gobert
 Thomas Gobert, architecte de l’aqueduc
 Hôtel Gobert
 Pavillon de Breteuil

17th-century French architects
Members of the Académie royale d'architecture
17th-century births
1710s deaths
Place of birth missing